Fanny Tardini-Vladicescu (1823-1908) was a Romanian opera singer and stage actor. 

In 1860, Tardini-Vladicescu became the manager of her own opera- and theatre company, Compania Fanny Tardini-Vlădicescu, which was famous in Romania and played a pioneer role in the nations' stage history.

References

1908 deaths
1823 births
19th-century Romanian women opera singers
19th-century Romanian actresses
19th-century theatre managers
Women theatre managers and producers